Protagonistas... aka Protagonistas de Novela, Protagonistas de la Música, Protagonistas de la Fama is a Spanish reality television franchise. It broadcasts in Spanish speaking countries in Latin America and Latin communities in the United States.

The game format is similar to Big Brother or Operación Triunfo (Star Academy) where a group of anonymous people competes in an isolated house to win a contract with a record company or a TV channel.

Star Academy around the world 
Currently, there are 28 winners of the Protagonistas format. The most recent winner is Laura Alemán from Puerto Rico.

Telemundo original programming